This article lists events from the year 2022 in Mozambique.

Incumbents 

 President: Filipe Nyusi
 Prime Minister: Carlos Agostinho do Rosário

Events 
Ongoing – COVID-19 pandemic in Mozambique

 January 3 – President Filipe Nyusi and his wife Isaura test positive for COVID-19.
 March 13 – Around 12 people in Mozambique are dead after Tropical Cyclone Gombe struck the Nampula and Zambezia provinces.
 March 24 – The World Health Organization announces that a polio vaccination campaign will begin in Malawi, Mozambique, Tanzania, and Zambia.
 April 13 – South Africa says that it is extending its participation in a multinational counter-insurgent coalition in Mozambique.
 May 18 – Mozambique confirms its first polio case in 30 years in the northwestern province of Tete.
 May 19 – A case of wild poliovirus is recorded in Mozambique for the first time since 1992.
 September 6 –
 Six people are killed and three others are kidnapped as Islamists insurgents raid the districts of Erati and Memba, Mozambique, torching dozens of houses. Six attackers are arrested.
 Gunmen storm the Comboni Missionary Sisters' church in Chipene, Mozambique, killing an Italian nun and setting ablaze the church, the nuns' homes and the hospital. Two other nuns and two priests escaped.
October 6 – Mozambique reports its first case of monkeypox.

See also 

2021–22 South-West Indian Ocean cyclone season
2022–23 South-West Indian Ocean cyclone season
COVID-19 pandemic in Africa
Islamic State of Iraq and the Levant
Al-Shabaab (militant group)

References 

 
2020s in Mozambique
Years of the 21st century in Mozambique
Mozambique